{{DISPLAYTITLE:C12H19NO3}}
The molecular formula C12H19NO3 (molar mass : 225.28 g/mol, exact mass : 225.136493) may refer to:

 BOD (psychedelic)
 Colterol
 Escaline
 Macromerine
 Metaescaline
 N-Methylmescaline
 Prenalterol
 Terbutaline
 Trimethoxyamphetamine